Curtis Township is a civil township of Alcona County in the U.S. state of Michigan. The population was 1,236 at the 2010 census.

Communities
 Bamfield is a former unincorporated community that served as a station along the Au Sable and Northwestern Railroad near Bamfield Pond along the Au Sable River.  A post office operated in Bamfield from Decemner 11, 1922 until June 30, 1924.  The post office closed and the community was deserted after the creation of the Alcona Dam, in which Bamfield Pond was expanded and currently known as Alcona Dam Pond.
Curtisville was settled in 1881 and named after the newly-established Curtis Township. It was named after its first settled E. D. Curtis. A post office opened under the name Curtis and operated briefly from June 14 until August 23, 1881. The post office was reestablished under the name Curtisville and operated from December 29, 1897 until February 15, 1955.
The community was first known as Glennie Station and began as a stop along the Detroit and Mackinac Railway in 1889. A post office opened on October 5, 1889 under the name Glennie Station and was shortened to Glennie on October 2, 1894. The community was platted much later in 1940. The Glennie post office remains open and uses the 48737 ZIP Code, which serves portions of Curtis Township and several surrounding townships. 
The community was named for Hugo Kurtz, and it began as a logging community around 1900. A post office opened briefly from July 31, 1909 until March 31, 1911.

History
Curtis Township was organized in 1881 and named for its first settler E. D. Curtis.

Geography

Major highways
 runs south–north through the center of the township.
 is a county-designated highway that has is western terminus at M-65 in Glennie.

Demographics

As of the census of 2000, there were 1,378 people, 608 households, and 432 families residing in the township.  The population density was 20.2 per square mile (7.8/km2).  There were 1,605 housing units at an average density of 23.5 per square mile (9.1/km2).  The racial makeup of the township was 98.62% White, 0.07% Native American, 0.07% Asian, 0.15% from other races, and 1.09% from two or more races. Hispanic or Latino of any race were 0.65% of the population.

There were 608 households, out of which 19.4% had children under the age of 18 living with them, 60.5% were married couples living together, 6.7% had a female householder with no husband present, and 28.9% were non-families. 24.8% of all households were made up of individuals, and 10.9% had someone living alone who was 65 years of age or older.  The average household size was 2.25 and the average family size was 2.66.

In the township the population was spread out, with 19.9% under the age of 18, 3.3% from 18 to 24, 20.1% from 25 to 44, 31.5% from 45 to 64, and 25.3% who were 65 years of age or older.  The median age was 50 years. For every 100 females there were 108.2 males.  For every 100 females age 18 and over, there were 103.3 males.

The median income for a household in the township was $27,048, and the median income for a family was $30,817. Males had a median income of $26,563 versus $22,778 for females. The per capita income for the township was $15,457.  About 11.7% of families and 15.1% of the population were below the poverty line, including 19.3% of those under age 18 and 12.9% of those age 65 or over.

Education
Curtis Township is served entirely by Alcona Community Schools.

References

Sources

External links
Curtis Township official website

Townships in Alcona County, Michigan
Townships in Michigan
1881 establishments in Michigan
Populated places established in 1881